Dash Atan may refer to:
 Dash Atan, Bostanabad
 Dash Atan, Maragheh